The Art Directors Guild Award for Outstanding Production Design for a Multi-Camera Series is an award handed out annually by the Art Directors Guild. It was introduced at the Art Directors Guilds' fifth annual honors, in 2001, after being combined with regular, one-hour series for the four previous ceremonies (including with miniseries and television films for the first).

Winners and nominations
"*" indicates a multi-camera series in years where categories were combined.

1990s
Excellence in Production Design Award - Television

Excellence in Production Design Award - Television Series

2000s
Excellence in Production Design Award - Multi-Camera Television Series

Excellence in Production Design Award - Multi-Camera, Variety or Unscripted Series

2010s
Excellence in Production Design Award - Multi-Camera Television Series

Excellence in Production Design Award - Multi-Camera, Variety or Unscripted Series

Excellence in Production Design Award - Multi-Camera Television Series

2020s

Programs with multiple awards

4 awards
 Will & Grace (NBC)

3 awards
 The Big Bang Theory (CBS)
 Mad TV (Fox)
 Saturday Night Live (NBC)

Programs with multiple nominations

10 nominations
 How I Met Your Mother (CBS)

9 nominations
 The Big Bang Theory (CBS)

8 nominations
 Will & Grace (NBC)

5 nominations
 Saturday Night Live (NBC)
 Two and a Half Men (CBS)

4 nominations
 2 Broke Girls (CBS)

3 nominations
 Family Reunion (Netflix)
 Mad TV (Fox)
 The Ranch (Netflix)
 Star Trek: Voyager (UPN)

2 nominations
 Bob Hearts Abishola (CBS)
 Frasier (NBC)
 Hell's Kitchen (Fox)
 Life with Bonnie (ABC)
 Rules of Engagement (CBS)
 Titus (Fox)
 The Voice (NBC)

References

Art Directors Guild Awards
American television awards
International Alliance of Theatrical Stage Employees
Awards established in 1996